Annuit cœptis is one of two mottos on the reverse side of the Great Seal of the United States. The literal translation is "[He/She] favors (or "has favored") [our] undertakings", from Latin annuo ("I approve, I favor"), and coeptum ("commencement, undertaking"). Because of its context as a caption above the Eye of Providence, the standard translations are "Providence favors our undertakings" and "Providence has favored our undertakings".

On the Great Seal 
In 1782, Samuel Adams appointed a design artist, William Barton of Philadelphia, to bring a proposal for the national seal. For the reverse, Barton suggested a 13-layered pyramid underneath the Eye of Providence. The mottos which Barton chose to accompany the design were Deo Favente ("with God's favor", or more literally, "with God favoring") and Perennis ("Everlasting"). The pyramid and Perennis motto had come from a $50 Continental currency bill designed by Francis Hopkinson.

Barton explained that the motto alluded to the Eye of Providence: "Deo favente which alludes to the Eye in the Arms, meant for the Eye of Providence." In western art, God is traditionally represented by the Eye of Providence, which principally symbolizes God's omniscience.

When designing the final version of the Great Seal, Charles Thomson (a former Latin teacher) kept the pyramid and eye for the reverse side but replaced the two mottos, using Annuit Cœptis instead of Deo Favente (and Novus ordo seclorum instead of Perennis). When he provided his official explanation of the meaning of this motto, he wrote:

Change from Deo Favente to Annuit Cœptis

Annuit Cœptis is translated by the U.S. State Department, the U.S. Mint, and the U.S. Treasury as, "He [God] has favored our undertakings" (brackets in original). However, the original Latin does not explicitly state who (or what) is the subject of the sentence.

Classical source of the motto
According to Richard S. Patterson and Richardson Dougall, Annuit cœptis (meaning "He favours our undertakings") and the other motto on the reverse of the Great Seal, Novus ordo seclorum (meaning "new order of the ages"), can both be traced to lines by the Roman poet Virgil. Annuit cœptis comes from the Aeneid, book IX, line 625, which reads, Iuppiter omnipotens, audacibus adnue coeptis. It is a prayer by Ascanius, the son of the hero of the story, Aeneas, which translates to, "Jupiter Almighty, favour [my] bold undertakings", just before slaying an enemy warrior, Numanus.

The same language also occurred in an earlier poem of Virgil, the Georgics. In line I.40 of that work is the phrase "da facilem cursum atque audacibus annue cœptis". The line is addressed to Caesar Augustus and translates to "give [us] an easy path and nod at our audacious undertakings."

Notes

See also 

 Novus ordo seclorum
 E pluribus unum
 Eye of Providence
 List of Latin phrases
 List of national mottos
 List of U.S. state and territory mottos
 United States national motto

References

Further reading

External links

Latin mottos
National symbols of the United States